Colin John Fraser Scott (14 May 1933 – 1 April 2014) was the Bishop of Hulme from 1984 until 1998.

Scott was educated at Berkhamsted School and Queens' College, Cambridge (becoming a Cambridge Master of Arts). After curacies at St Barnabas, Clapham Common and  St James, Hatcham he was Vicar of St Mark, Kennington. Following this he was Vice-Chairman of the  Southwark Diocesan Pastoral Committee  and  then (his final appointment before elevation to the episcopate)  Team Rector of Sanderstead. In retirement he served the Church as an honorary assistant bishop within the Diocese of Leicester. He was a prominent member of the Anglican Pacifist Fellowship.

References

1933 births
2014 deaths
People educated at Berkhamsted School
Alumni of Queens' College, Cambridge
20th-century Church of England bishops
Bishops of Hulme
Anglican pacifists